The eighth series of British drama series Bad Girls premiered on ITV on 13 July 2006. This, the final series, consists of eleven episodes which concluded with a Christmas special on 20 December 2006.

Series Eight introduces Amanda Donohoe (Lou Stoke), Sid Owen (Donny Kimber), Colin Salmon (Rowan Dunlop) and Angela Bruce (Mandy Goodhue). James Gaddas appears for the final time as Neil Grayling in the first episode in a guest appearance. Tracey Wilkinson (Di Barker),  Rebecca Hazlewood (Arun Palmer) and Andrew Scarborough (Kevin Spiers) are not featured and no explanation for their absence is given. 

This series does not follow the previous series and commences with new storylines, leaving several from the previous season unresolved.

Cast

Main

 Amanda Donohoe as Lou Stoke
 Liz May Brice as Pat Kerrigan
 Helen Fraser as Sylvia Hollamby 
 Dannielle Brent as Natalie Buxton (Episodes 1 - 7)
 Antonia Okonma as Darlene Cake
 Victoria Bush as Tina O'Kane 
 Stephanie Beacham as Phyl Oswyn
 Amanda Barrie as Bev Tull 
 Nicola Stapleton as Janine Nabeski 
 Sid Owen as Donny Kimber
 Colin Salmon as Rowan Dunlop
 Angela Bruce as Mandy Goodhue
 Victoria Alcock as Julie Saunders
 Kika Mirylees as Julie Johnston
 Ellie Haddington as Joy Masterton

Special guest
 James Gaddas as Neil Grayling (episode 1)
 Annette Badland as Angela Robbins (episode 3)
 Jan Francis as Catherine Earlham (episode 10)
 Dannielle Brent as Natalie Buxton (episode 11)

Recurring and guest cast
Recurring cast:

 Laura Dos Santos as Emira Al Jahani (episodes 1, 2 & 3)
 Charlotte Eaton as Nurse Fitt (episode 2, 4, 9 & 10)
 Melanie Cameron as Vicky Stoke (episode 4, 5, 6, 8 & 9) 
 Helen Modern as Stella Gough (episodes 4 & 5)
 Steven Webb as David Saunders (episodes 5, 6 & 11)
 Gugu Mbatha-Raw as Fidelity Saunders (episodes 6 & 11) 
 Louis Waymouth as Bobby Darren Hollamby (episode 11)

Guest cast:

 Conor Alexander as Hassan Al Jahani (episodes 1 & 3)
 Sandra de Sousa as Ashlee Wilcox (episode 1)
 Bill Buckhurst as Jack (episode 1)
 Andrew Forbes as D.I. Barrow (episode 1)
 Nadia Jordan as Gayle (episode 1)
 Christopher Rogers as Newsreader (episodes 1 & 2)
 Steve Swinscoe as Mr. Nebeski (episode 2)
 Samuel Oatley as Ian Nebeski (episode 2)
 Neil Conrich as D.I. Thackeray (episodes 2 & 3)
 Quill Roberts as Lawyer (episode 2)
 Sarah Akehurst as Call Girl (episode 2)
 Jon Carver as Sergeant Havers (episode 3)
 Rashid Karapiet as Imam (episode 3)
 Endy McKay as Sherie as (episode 4)
 Olivia Hurdle as Vanessa (episode 5)
 Emma Linley as Elizabeth (episode 5)
 Henrietta Meire as Tracey (episode 5)
 Simona Roman as Nurse (episode 5)
 Richard Syms as Humanist officiant (episode 6)
 Sally Tatum as Fidelity's friend (episode 6)
 John R. Walker as Natalie's accomplice (episode 6)
 Benjamin Cato as Binman (episode 6) / Ben Cato as Gary (episode 10) 
 Lucy Bayler as Hannah Dunlop (episodes 7, 8 & 9)
 Abhin Galeya as Solicitor (episode 7)
 Annette Bentley as Maggie (episode 7)
 Cheryl Fergison as Latoya (episode 7)
 Pete Geddis as Ted (episode 7)
 Andrew Hilton as Judge Lloyd (episode 7)
 Murray Ewan as Mr. Fisk (episode 7)
 Ben Scotchbrook as Newsreader (episodes 7 & 8)
 Joseph Steyne as Prisoner (episode 7)
 Matthew Butler-Hart as Police Officer (episode 7)
 Leon Davies as Prison Officer (episode 7)
 Celia Bannerman as Mrs. Fisk (episode 8)
 Eddie Osei as George (episode 8)
 Fern Britton as herself (episode 10)
 Phillip Schofield as himself (episode 10)
 Gerry Hinks as Frank Earlham (episode 10)
 David Lumsden as Lawyer (episode 10)
 Dickon Tolson as Steve (episode 10)
 Paul Bridle as Brian (episode 11)

Episodes

Reception

Ratings

Awards nomination
 National Television Awards – Most Popular Drama (Nominated)

Home Media

United Kingdom
 "Series Eight" – 26 December 2006 (3-DVD set distributed by 2 Entertain)
 As part of "Series Five to Eight" (14-DVD set distributed by 2 Entertain)  
 "The Complete Series Eight" re-release – 2 April 2012 (3-DVD set distributed by Acorn Media) 
 As part of "The Complete Collection" – 2 July 2012 (28-DVD set distributed by Acorn Media)

Australia
 "Series Eight" – 1 September 2007 (3-DVD set distributed by Shock Records) 
 As part of "The Complete Collection" – 10 November 2010 (32-DVD set distributed by Shock Records)
 "Series Eight" re-release (individual from "The Complete Collection") – 1 June 2011 (3-DVD set distributed by Shock Records)

References

External links
 
 Bad Girls Season 8 at the Internet Movie Database

08
2006 British television seasons